Timo Koskela (born January 23, 1979) is a Finnish former professional ice hockey player.

He last played in Switzerland for GCK Lions of the National League B during the 2012-13 season. He also used to play for Tappara of the SM-liiga.

References

External links

1979 births
Living people
St. Louis Blues scouts
Ice hockey people from Tampere
Tappara players
Finnish ice hockey right wingers